Aleksandrs Jackēvičs (born March 25, 1958 in Dobele) is a Latvian judoka who competed for the Soviet Union in the 1980 Summer Olympics.

In 1980 he won the bronze medal in the middleweight class.

External links
 

1958 births
Living people
Latvian male judoka
Soviet male judoka
Olympic judoka of the Soviet Union
Judoka at the 1980 Summer Olympics
Olympic bronze medalists for the Soviet Union
Olympic medalists in judo
People from Dobele
Medalists at the 1980 Summer Olympics